Pae is a genus of square-headed wasps in the family Crabronidae. There are about eight described species in Pae.

Species
These eight species belong to the genus Pae:
 Pae amaripa Pate, 1944 i c g
 Pae beniae Leclercq, 1995 i c g
 Pae macasae Leclercq, 1995 i c g
 Pae manausae Leclercq, 2005 i c g
 Pae napoensis Leclercq, 1995 i c g
 Pae nasicornis (F. Smith, 1873) i c g
 Pae paniquita Pate, 1944 i c g
 Pae surinamensis Leclercq, 1995 i c g
Data sources: i = ITIS, c = Catalogue of Life, g = GBIF, b = Bugguide.net

References

Further reading

 
 

Crabronidae